Hilarión Pérez Guerra (c. 1800 – c. 1870) was Mayor of Ponce, Puerto Rico, from January 1857 to 11 July 1863. Prior to serving as mayor of Ponce, Perez Guerra had served as mayor of Camuy for 1 year in 1850.

Mayoral term

A festivity, later known as Carnaval de Ponce, takes place in 1858. This is the earliest known recorded date of the event taking place in Ponce.

See also

 List of Puerto Ricans
 List of mayors of Ponce, Puerto Rico

References

Mayors of Ponce, Puerto Rico
1800s births
1870s deaths
Year of birth uncertain
Year of death uncertain